When Spring Comes is a 2022 South Korean film directed by Lee Don-ku, starring Son Hyun-joo, Park Hyuk-kwon, Jung Seok-yong, Son Sook, Park So-jin and Jung Ji-hwan. The film depicts the story of a man trying to make big money at his father's funeral where all of his acquaintances have gathered, and gets caught up in an uncontrollable incident. It was released theatrically on April 27, 2022.

Synopsis 
Ho-seong (Park Hyuk-kwon) who was once a powerful figure in a criminal organization is released from prison after 8 years. Now, his younger brother Jong-seong (Park Hyuk-kwon) is treated as a nuisance, and his eldest daughter Eun-ok (Park So-jin), who is about to get married, and his son Dong-hyuk (Jung Ji-hwan), whom he met after a long time, are ashamed of him. At the funeral of his father, where all his acquaintances are gathered, Ho-seong plans to collect condolence money and start a new business, dreaming of a second heyday. But, two rival gangs fighting for power arrive at the funeral. At the same time, Hoseong's friend Yang-hee (Jung Seok-yong), who has no clue, gets drunk and starts acting unrecoverable.

Cast 
 Son Hyun-joo as Ho-seong
 Park Hyuk-kwon as Jong-seong, Ho-seong's younger brother
 Jung Seok-yong as Yang-hee, Ho-seong's hometown friend
 Park So-jin as Eun-ok, Ho-seong's eldest daughter
 Jung Ji-hwan as Dong-hyuk, Ho-seong's youngest son
 Son Sook as Jeong-nim, Ho-seong's mother
 Lee Ji-hoon as The person who protects Ho-seong

Production 
Principal photography began on April 20, 2021.

References

External links
 
 
 

2022 films
2022 drama films
2020s Korean-language films
2020s South Korean films
South Korean drama films
Films about families
Films about funerals
Films set in South Chungcheong Province